Jagamohana Ramayana also known as Dandi Ramayana popularly across Odisha is an epic poem composed by the 15th-century poet Balarama Dasa. This work is a retelling of the Ramayana though not a direct translation.

Synopsis
The story of this version is presented as a narration by Lord Shiva to Goddess Parvati.The plot moves as a form of dialogue between the two. The story begins with Sati and how Shiva finally gets back Sati in form of Parvati. After getting Parvati together , Shiva narrates the story of Rama to Parvati. The central plot of the Sanskrit Ramayana is followed in the text. However there are some significant departures in the sub plots and minor character. Hence it isn't a translation of original Sanskrit Ramayana. It is said that the poet hadn't read original Sanskrit Ramayana in his lifetime.And he wrote about it by getting information from local priests and folklore.

Structure
The work is written in a meter called Dandi Vritta. It is a 14 letter meter suitable for narrative style. It is a lengthy work. The epic keeps seven cantos of the original Sanskrit Ramayana. They are:

 Adi Kanda - 
 Ayodhya Kanda - 
 Bana Kanda - 
 Kiskindha Kanda - 
 Sundara Kanda - 
 Yuddha Kanda - 
 Uttara kanda -

Cultural aspects
This work brought the tale of Ramayana to the Odia speaking region and it became quite popular. It faced significant opposition from the Sanskrit proponents and opponents of Odia literature. It is heavily influenced by the Jagannath culture. In multiple places the writer says that the writing is carried out by Jagannath himself. The book also enlightens some significant aspect of contemporary lifestyle. There are descriptions of pregnancy, customs and rituals followed during pregnancy etc. There descriptions of cultural practices that follows the birth of a child. There are descriptions of natural beauty of Odisha, living standards, foods, locations etc. It also contains reference to the popular Indian foods at the time such as Puri, Malpua, Laddu and Rasgulla.

Derivative works
There were multiple books written that summarised the Jagamohana Ramayana called . There were several of these abridged versions. One such work by Maheswara Dasa was just forty printed pages.

In southern Odisha, the original Odia Ramayana circulated with new material being added over the years. This eventually grew to a massive volume of 3000 pages.

See also
Jagamohan Ramayana in Devanagari script
 Typical Selections from Oriya Literature, B C Mazumdaar, 1918

References

 
Hindu texts
15th-century poems
Odia literature